The Fred Award is the highest honour at the New Zealand International Comedy Festival, awarded to the best show written and performed by a New Zealand Comedian.

The Award is named in honour of Fred Dagg, beloved New Zealand comedian John Clarke's most well known character. Clarke as Dagg was one of New Zealand's most recognisable comedic characters from the 1970s and is considered to be an icon of New Zealand pop culture.

"The Fred" award winner receives Dagg's Gumboot as a trophy.

History 
The award was established in 2006 by the NZ Comedy Trust to recognise "The outstanding work of an established professional kiwi comedian." In 2014 the criteria were simplified to become "best show" by a New Zealander.

"The Fred" Gumboot is presented along with the Billy T Award at the end of festival prize-giving showcase "Last Laughs" where nominated finalists perform their final set of the festival. The winner is decided by a panel of judges and the prize is presented by the winner from the previous year.

The Fred Award Winners

References 

Awards established in 2006